Heungbuga is one of the five surviving stories of the Korean pansori storytelling tradition. It is also called Baktaryeong (hangul: 박타령). The other stories are Simcheongga, Chunhyangga, Jeokbyeokga and Sugungga. It is about the story of Heungbu, a poor but good man with many children.
Heungbuga depicts common people's lives with a folksy atmosphere. Many listeners prefer Heungbuga because of its focus on humor. This humor in pansori is called jaedam sori, which means funny sound in Korean.

The most famous part of Heungbuga is "Cranky Nolbu," depicting the nasty Nolbu in a light-hearted fashion with a fast Jajinmori rhythm.
It is widely considered that the latter part of Heungbuga is inferior to the beginning. One explanation for this is that the latter part was not sufficiently revised by its singers over the years. This could be used as evidence for the importance of deoneum in pansori.

Plot

Heungbuga is also called Bak taryung (Gourd Song). Poor but good-hearted younger brother Heungbu cares for a swallow's broken leg, and the swallow repays Heungbu's kindness. The swallow brings a gourd seed to Heungbu, who plants the seed. The gourd yields fruit containing treasure. Upon hearing this, Heungbu's older brother, the nasty and greedy Nolbu, becomes jealous, and he breaks a swallow's leg intentionally. After that Nolbu, too,  gets a gourd seed; however this time the fruit contains goblins.

See also
 Korean music
 Pansori
 Pansori gosu
 Culture of Korea

References

 National Changguk Company of Korea

External links
 동편제 명창들 “관객 몰러 나간다”, 《Hankyoreh》, 27 September 2007

Pansori
Korean folklore